Tennessee's 1st Senate district is one of 33 districts in the Tennessee Senate. It has been represented by Republican Adam Lowe since 2023.

Geography
District 1 covers much of rural East Tennessee between Knoxville and the Tri-Cities, including all of Cocke, Greene, and Hamblen Counties and part of Sevier County. Communities in the district include Morristown, Greeneville, Newport, Tusculum, Mosheim, and northern Sevierville.

The district is located entirely within Tennessee's 1st congressional district, and overlaps with the 5th, 10th, 11th, 12th, and 17th districts of the Tennessee House of Representatives. It borders the state of North Carolina.

Recent election results
Tennessee Senators are elected to staggered four-year terms, with odd-numbered districts holding elections in midterm years and even-numbered districts holding elections in presidential years.

2018

2014

Federal and statewide results in District 1

References 

1
Cocke County, Tennessee
Greene County, Tennessee
Hamblen County, Tennessee
Sevier County, Tennessee